Momarken Travbane is a harness racing track located at Momarken in Eidsberg, Norway. Owned by Norwegian Trotting Association, its tote betting is handled by Norsk Rikstoto. The venue opened in 1920.

References

External links
 Official website

Sports venues in Viken
Harness racing venues in Norway
Event venues established in 1920
1920 establishments in Norway